The 2007–08 Bundesliga was the 45th season of the Bundesliga, Germany's premier football league. It began on 10 August 2007 and ended on 17 May 2008. VfB Stuttgart were the defending champions.

Competition format
Every team played two games against each other team, one at home and one away. Teams received three points for a win and one point for a draw. If two or more teams were tied on points, places were determined by goal difference and, if still tied, by goals scored. The team with the most points were crowned champions while the three teams with the fewest points were relegated to 2. Bundesliga.

Background
Bayern Munich secured their 21st title with a 0–0 draw at VfL Wolfsburg on 4 May 2008. Bayern were good value for their title, having conceded only 21 goals, losing only two games in the process. Their completely overhauled squad hinged on the performances of Italy striker Luca Toni, who found the back of the net 24 times, and France winger Franck Ribéry, who won the Player of the Year award. Bayern coach Ottmar Hitzfeld was named Manager of the Year as well, to round off a thoroughly successful season for Bayern. Werder Bremen finished their first season without Miroslav Klose on 66 points, a distant ten points behind Bayern, in second place. Schalke 04 finished in the last Champions League place, two points behind Bremen. Joining Hamburger SV in the UEFA Cup spot were season surprise packages Wolfsburg, who finished in fifth place. Borussia Dortmund, though suffering a terrible domestic campaign, finishing 13th, managed to qualify for the UEFA Cup as well, having finished runners-up in the DFB-Pokal final, losing to Bayern Munich. 1. FC Nürnberg, MSV Duisburg and Hansa Rostock were all automatically relegated, having suffered a combined 58 defeats in the campaign.

Teams
Mainz 05, Alemannia Aachen and Borussia Mönchengladbach were relegated to the 2. Bundesliga after finishing in the last three places. They were replaced by Karlsruher SC, Hansa Rostock and MSV Duisburg.

2007–08 teams

Hertha BSC
Arminia Bielefeld
VfL Bochum
SV Werder Bremen
Energie Cottbus
Borussia Dortmund
MSV Duisburg (2006–07 2. Bundesliga third place)
Eintracht Frankfurt
Hamburger SV

Hannover 96
Karlsruher SC (2006–07 2. Bundesliga winner)
Bayer Leverkusen
Bayern Munich
1. FC Nürnberg
Hansa Rostock (2006–07 2. Bundesliga runner-up)
Schalke 04
VfB Stuttgart
VfL Wolfsburg

Stadia and locations

Personnel and kits

Managerial changes

League table

Results

Statistics

Top goalscorers
Source: www.kicker.de

Awards

Annual awards
Player of the Year:  Franck Ribéry (Bayern Munich)

Manager of the Year:  Ottmar Hitzfeld (Bayern Munich)

Monthly awards
Player of the Month

Champion squad

See also
 List of German football transfers summer 2007
 List of German football transfers winter 2007–08

References

External links

Official site of the DFB 
Kicker.de 
Official site of the Bundesliga 
Official site of the Bundesliga

Bundesliga seasons
1
Germany